Michael Neel (born July 18, 1951) is an American former cyclist. He competed in the individual road race event at the 1976 Summer Olympics.  Then, as a new professional, at the 1976 Professional World Road Race, he finished in 10th place 

He was the directeur sportif of the 7-Eleven Cycling Team from 1985 to 1989.

References

External links
The Bike Whisperer
http://www.pezcyclingnews.com/interviews/mike-neel-beating-on-the-door/

1951 births
Living people
American male cyclists
Olympic cyclists of the United States
Cyclists at the 1976 Summer Olympics
Sportspeople from Berkeley, California